The Canadian men's national under 18 ice hockey team is part of a three-stage Program of Excellence beginning with the Under-17 regional teams and ending with the National Junior Team. The primary objectives of the Under-18 program are to identify, evaluate, and condition players to the rigors of international competition by giving first exposure to off-shore officiating, ice-surfaces, and travel.

The Under-18 squad traditionally competes in the month of August, during the off season, to allow players to further develop skills with their respective junior teams in the winter following a week-long camp. A 22-player roster is chosen by scouts and coaches from Hockey Canada to represent Canada on the international stage.

The first National Men's Under-18 Team was created in 1981 with the development of the Program of Excellence and has since competed in many international competitions. For the first 10 years of the program, the National Men's Under-18 Team participated in exchange camps with the United States to provide both countries the opportunity to refine the skills of their most gifted young players against top caliber international competition. It was not until the Japanese Ice Hockey Federation introduced the Phoenix Cup, a four-nation tournament designed to improve Japan's international hockey program, in 1991 that Canada took part in an international tournament.

The Phoenix Cup (later the Pacific Cup and La Copa Mexico) was a single round robin competition between the national under-18 teams of Canada, Russia, Japan, and the United States. It was competed for between 1991 and 1996, with tournaments in Japan; Mexico City; and Nelson, B.C. In its six-year history, Canada took home three gold medals, two silver and one bronze.

In 1997, the National Men's Under-18 Team competed against Slovakia and the Czech Republic in a three-nation tournament in the Czech Republic. Canada captured gold and repeated their performance the following year in Slovakia against Belarus, Slovakia, and the Czech Republic.

Since 2002, Canada's National Men's Under-18 Team has taken part in the IIHF World Under-18 Championship, winning four gold medals (2003, 2008, 2013 and 2021), one silver medal (2005), and three bronze medals (2012, 2014, and 2015).

Roster

IIHF U18 World Championships roster
Roster for the 2022 IIHF World U18 Championships:

Head coach: Nolan Baumgartner

Ivan Hlinka Memorial Tournament roster
Roster for the 2022 Hlinka Gretzky Cup.

Head coach: Stéphane Julien

International competitions

IIHF World U18 Championships

1999: Did not compete
2000: Did not compete
2001: Did not compete
2002: 6th place
2003:  Gold
2004: 4th place
2005:  Silver
2006: 4th place
2007: 4th place
2008:  Gold
2009: 4th place
2010: 7th place

2011: 4th place
2012:  Bronze
2013:  Gold
2014:  Bronze
2015:  Bronze
2016: 4th place
2017: 5th place
2018: 5th place
2019: 4th place
2021:  Gold
2022: 5th place
|}

Hlinka Gretzky Cup

1991:  Silver
1992:  Gold
1993:  Bronze
1994:  Gold
1995:  Silver
1996:  Gold
1997:  Gold
1998:  Gold
1999:  Gold
2000:  Gold
2001:  Gold
2002:  Gold
2003: 4th place
2004:  Gold
2005:  Gold

2006:  Gold
2007: 4th place
2008:  Gold
2009:  Gold
2010:  Gold
2011:  Gold
2012:  Gold
2013:  Gold
2014:  Gold
2015:  Gold
2016: 5th place
2017:  Gold
2018:  Gold
2019:  Silver
2021: Did not compete
2022:  Gold
|}

References

External links 
 Team Canada all time scoring leaders in IIHF U18 World Championships
 Hockey Canada U18 home page

National under-18 ice hockey teams
Youth ice hockey in Canada
Ice
National sports teams of Canada